Park Hyung-jin (24 June 1990) is a South Korean football player. He currently plays for Suwon Samsung Bluewings.

His elder brother, Park Jin-soo, is also a football player.

Statistics
Updated to 29 June 2021.

1Includes Japanese Super Cup, K League 1 Final B, K League 1 Final A and FIFA Club World Cup.

References

External links

Profile at V-Varen Nagasaki

Living people
1990 births
South Korean footballers
J1 League players
J2 League players
Sanfrecce Hiroshima players
Tochigi SC players
V-Varen Nagasaki players
Fagiano Okayama players
Expatriate footballers in Japan
Association football defenders

Pocheon Citizen FC players
Sportspeople from South Gyeongsang Province